SS  Oceanic was a cruise ship built in 1963 by Cantieri Riuniti dell' Adriatico, Monfalcone, Italy for Home Lines. Between 1985 and 2000, she sailed for Premier Cruise Line under the names Starship Oceanic and Big Red Boat I, before being sold to Pullmantur Cruises and reverting to her original name. In 2009 was sold to a new owner-operator, Peace Boat, which kept her until 2012.  She was broken up in China later that year.

Concept and construction
Oceanic was the first newbuilt ship ordered by Home Lines. She was ordered from the Cantieri Riuniti dell' Adriatico shipyard at Monfalcone, Italy. She was designed as a combined two-class ocean liner and one-class cruise ship, running line voyages from Cuxhaven, Southampton, and Le Havre to Canada during the northern hemisphere summer and cruising during the winter.

The ship included many forward-looking features that are still included in present-day cruise ships, such as a magrodome covering the pool area, and life-boats located not on the top of the ship, but on separate lifeboat bays, lower on the hull.

Oceanic was launched from drydock on 15 January 1963. She was originally to be launched a week before, but due to unusually cold weather in Italy, the launch had to be delayed. Her fitting out took over two years, until the ship was finally delivered to Home Lines in March 1965. By this time, the company had decided to abandon transatlantic service due to falling passenger numbers and the establishment of the associated Hamburg Atlantic Line. As a result, Oceanic never in fact was used on the Europe–Canada service. Home Lines (incorrectly) marketed her as "the largest ship ever designed for year-round cruises". In their marketing material, Home Lines also used British tonnage measurement for the ship (giving her tonnage as ), even though she was registered in Panama, and by Panamanian measurements she was only .

Service history

1965–1985: Career with Home Lines

Oceanic was delivered to Home Lines in March 1965. On 31 March, she left on a transatlantic crossing with fare-paying passengers (only 200 of them) from Genoa to New York City. She made a short series of transatlantic crossings, following which she entered cruise service from New York to the Bahamas on 24 April 1965, operating in tandem with the company's older . During summers, Oceanic ran seven-day cruises from New York to the Bahamas with longer cruises to the Caribbean during the winter. Oceanic was one of the most successful cruise ships of her time, operating consistently at 95% capacity with cruises booked up to one year in advance.

In 1982, Home Lines took delivery of the new , which supplanted the Oceanic as the company flagship. Another new ship, was slated for delivery in 1986. In preparation for this, Oceanic was sold to Premier Cruise Line in 1985.

1985–2000: Career with Premier Cruises

Following sale to Premier Cruise Line, Oceanic was renamed the StarShip Oceanic and initially placed on three- and four-day cruises from Port Canaveral to Nassau and Salt Cay in the Bahamas. This cruise could be combined with a stay at Walt Disney World. Later, during her career with Premier Cruises, she was often marketed as "The Big Red Boat", and in 2000, she was renamed Big Red Boat I. However, Premier Cruise Line went bankrupt in September 2000. The Oceanic was detained by port authorities at Freeport, Bahamas, laid up and placed for sale.

2000–2009: Career with Pullmantur Cruises
On 30 December 2000, the Big Red Boat I was acquired by the newly founded, Spain-based Pullmantur Cruises. She reverted to the name Oceanic and sailed to Cadiz, Spain for refurbishment. Following completion of her refurbishment, the ship entered service on cruises from Barcelona in May 2001. During her career with Pullmantur, Oceanic was gradually rebuilt by removing flammable materials so that the ship would be better in keeping with the new SOLAS regulations coming into effect in 2010.

Oceanic was reportedly due to be withdrawn from service with Pullmantur in September 2009. In March 2009, the ship was sold to the Japan-based Peace Boat, with delivery date already in April 2009.

2009–2012: Career with Peace Boat
Oceanic entered service with Peace Boat on 23 April 2009, departing Yokohama on an around-the-world cruise that was due to conclude in Yokohama on 6 August 2009. Oceanics circumnavigation was Peace Boat's 66th "Global Voyage for Peace", and the first to feature extensive visits to various ports in Scandinavia, with a goal of learning about the northern European welfare and education systems.

Sometime during the week between 3 and 9 May 2010, the Oceanic came under attack by pirates while off the coast of Yemen. The ship was attacked by grenades, but managed to avoid being boarded by adopting zig-zag manoeuvres and blasting the pirates with high-pressure water hoses. Reportedly the pirates were subsequently apprehended by NATO forces.

2012: Scrapping
On Friday 5 May 2012, the Oceanic sailed to Yokohama on its last cruise for Peace Boat. The vessel returned to Pullmantur Cruises in exchange for the Ocean Dream, which became the new Peace Boat vessel. The Oceanic was sent to Zhoushan, China for scrapping in July 2012.

References

External links 

 
 Video Clips of Oceanic

Ocean liners
Cruise ships
Ships built in Monfalcone
1963 ships
Ships built by Cantieri Riuniti dell'Adriatico